Bones and Names is a 2023 German drama film written and directed by Fabian Stumm in his feature directorial debut, starring himself along with Knut Berger, Marie-Lou Sellem and Susie Meyer. The relationship drama presents subtle irony of the partnership between an actor and an author that turns out to be more vulnerable to crises than expected.

It is selected in Perspektive Deutsches Kino  to compete for the  Compass-Perspektive-Award at the 73rd Berlin International Film Festival, where it had its world premiere on 19 February 2023. The film is also nominated for Best Feature Film Teddy Award.

Synopsis
Boris is an actor and Jonathan a writer both have been in relationship for many years. Their relationship is now at turning point as both have found new interests. Jonathan is totally lost in writing a new novel and actor Boris and his younger colleague Tim are getting closer. At the same time Jonathan's single sister, Natasha and her puckish young daughter Josie are struggling for distance, closeness, trust, desire and fear of loss. They both are turning to unconventional ways to deal with the relationship issues.

Cast
 Fabian Stumm as Boris
 Knut Berger as Jonathan
 Marie-Lou Sellem as Jeanne
 Susie Meyer as Carla
 Magnus Mariuson as Tim
 Doreen Fietz as Natascha
 Alma Meyer-Prescott as Josie
 Anneke Kim Sarnau as Helen
 Godehard Giese as Becks
 Ruth Reinecke as Heidi
 Ernst Stötzner as Michael
 Anne Haug as Stella
 Louise Helm as Marie
 Haley Louise Jones as Naima
 Tanju Bilir as Yasin
 Nicola Heim as Lucy
 Milena Thirty as Lara
 Rainer Sellien as Dahlmann

Production

Fabian Stumm after the award-winning 2022 short film Daniel, planned the feature-length film. He in addition to his work as a screenwriter and director, also choose to have  leading role. The filming began on 19 September 2022 in Berlin and was wrapped up on 7 October 2022.

Release
Bones and Names had its  premiere on 19 February 2023 as part of the 73rd Berlin International Film Festival, in Perspektive Deutsches Kino. It is slated for release in cinemas in autumn of 2023.

Reception

The film received generally positive reviews, with Harald Mühlbeyer of Kino-Zeit calling the film "a highly successful play with the formalities of filmmaking and with the emotions that cinema can generate." 

For Peter Gutting of Film-Rezensionen, the film is "a relationship film infused with quiet humor. Director Fabian Stumm exposes the cracks in partnerships on various levels with great seriousness and sensitivity, without compromising the entertainment value of his debut. That doesn't make the film a comedy yet, but a sensitive study of the nuances in human coexistence." 

Kira Taszman from Filmdienst writes: "The sketch of two creative people who sometimes take their art too much into life and vice versa succeeds. The portrayal of a long-term relationship between love, sensitivities, habit and not always admitted desire for something new between two partners, played very engagingly by Fabian Stumm and Knut Berger, is also convincing." 

In contrast, Lida Bach of movie break rated the film 3 out of 10 and wrote, "Fabian Stumm's meaningless and uneventful self-reflection works best as an involuntary milieu study of the upper middle class." Concluding Bach opined that "production is a lesson in cinematic adeptism" and said, "In addition to relevance and substance, it lacks humor and drama."

Accolades

References

External links
 
 
 Bones and Names at Berlinale
 Bones and Names at Film portal 
 Bones and Names at Crew United

2023 films
2023 drama films
2020s German-language films
German drama films
2023 LGBT-related films
German LGBT-related films
LGBT-related drama films